Boxing has featured as a sport at the Youth Olympic Summer Games since its first edition in 2010. The Youth Olympic Games are multi-sport event and the games are held every four years just like the Olympic Games.

Editions

Format
The boxing competition is organized as a set of tournaments, one for each weight class.  The number of weight classes has changed over the years and the definition of each class has changed as shown in the following tables.

Medal table
As of the 2018 Summer Youth Olympics.

Participating nations

See also
Boxing at the Summer Olympics

External links
Youth Olympic Games

 
Youth Olympics
Sports at the Summer Youth Olympics